Natalia Pelevine (born on 2 November 1976) is a British-Russian playwright, political activist and blogger.

Early years
Natalia Pelevine was born in Moscow in 1976. She moved to England as a child and attended a private school, Southbank International. She then received BA in Art History from a London University.

Career

Theatre
In 2004, Pelevine set up a theatre production company, First Act Productions, which is based in London. She wrote In Your Hands, a play based on the events of the Moscow theater hostage crisis. It was first staged in October 2006 in North London at the New End Theatre. The Russian version of In Your Hands, directed by Skanderbek Tulparov, had its premiere at the Russian Dramatic Theatre in Makhachkala, Dagestan, in April 2008 and was banned after its opening night performance by the President of Dagestan, Mukhu Aliyev, who attended the performance. Reuters covered the event that was picked up by many major global media outlets.

Her play I Plead Guilty had its New York premiere in May 2011 at Gene Frankel theatre.

Political
Pelevine was one of the people behind the independent research into the Moscow theatre siege. A member of NGO Nord Ost, she remains in close contact with Nord Ost and Beslan victims and their families. Pelevine consulted on a number of documentary films about the Moscow theatre siege.

Pelevine has appeared as a political commentator on Al Jazeera, RTVi, PressTV, the BBC and other TV and radio channels. She was also involved with the Strategy-31 Abroad organization, which rallied for the article 31 of the Russian Constitution and for freedom and democracy in Russia, and opposes the current government. She was the organizer of the New York Strategy 31 pickets, on 31 August and 31 October 2010. She also organized an Oleg Kashin picket in November 2010 and a demonstration in support of Mikhail Khodorkovsky on 12 December 2010, during which she mentioned setting up a new movement. In early 2011, the Democratic Russia Committee was founded by Pelevine and supporters.

Formerly the head of the December 5 Party, Pelevine joined RPR-PARNAS in March 2015.

A criminal investigation into Pelevine was opened by the Investigative Committee of Russia.

Personal life
According to The Independent, in 2009 she was engaged to a Russian Special Forces officer, Andrei Yakhnev. They have since split up.

References

External links
 http://www.kommersant.ru/doc.aspx?DocsID=877318&ThemesID=56
 http://www.doollee.com/PlaywrightsP/pelevine-Pelevine.html
 http://nord-ost.org/poslednie-novosti/v-tvoih-rukah_ru.html
 
 http://www.newsru.com/arch/cinema/19sep2006/dunt.html
 http://www.novayagazeta.ru/data/2008/24/01.html
 http://www.echo.msk.ru/news/511196-echo.html
 http://www.radiolynx.ro/news.php?offset=1615&id=6888
 http://www.gazeta.ru/politics/2008/04/07_a_2688183.shtml
 http://www.hotnews.ro/stiri-international-5239253-disneyland-kremlin.htm

British dramatists and playwrights
Living people
1977 births
Writers from Moscow
People's Freedom Party politicians
21st-century Russian women politicians
Politicians from Moscow